Lara is a semi-autobiographical novel-in-verse written by Bernardine Evaristo. It was originally published in 1997 by Angela Royal Publishing and won the EMMA Best Book Award in 1999. Drawing on family life, childhood and an inter-racial marriage, Lara explores the struggles of London living in the 1960s and '70s, travelling through seven generations of predecessors, spanning over 150 years to follow their lives in England, Nigeria, Ireland, Germany and Brazil. In 2009  a new, revised and expanded edition was published by Bloodaxe Books, with a photograph of the author's parents on their wedding day in Camberwell, London, 1955, as the cover.

Reception

Reviews 
Evaristo's Lara was voted Book of the Year three times. The New Statesman said: "first novels don't often make my heart beat faster….Bernardine Evaristo is a gifted black writer. Her Lara is a beautifully written novel-in-verse", while Black British newspaper The Weekly Journal praised her "skill as a storyteller as well as a poet, Lara is a work that is finely crafted in both detail and delivery."

Honours and awards 

New Statesman Book of the Year
Telegraph Book of the Year
Weekly Journal Book of the Year
 1999: EMMA Best Book Award for Lara

Bibliography 
Lara (Angela Royal Publishing, 1997)
Lara – new, expanded edition (Bloodaxe Books, 2009)

References 

1997 British novels
Novels by Bernardine Evaristo
Verse novels